The 1995 NBA All-Star Game was the 45th edition of the All-Star Game. The Western Conference won 139-112. The city of Phoenix hosted the event for the second time (the only previous All-Star game there occurred in 1975). Mitch Richmond of the Sacramento Kings was voted MVP of the game.

The 1995 NBA All-Star Game was broadcast by NBC the fifth consecutive year.

Background information 
Charles Barkley was the main host of the event. During a break in the game near the fourth quarter he even wanted to shoot himself out of a catapult, but his coach made sure he didn't do it because he did not want his star player to get injured.

Grant Hill of the Detroit Pistons was the first rookie in NBA history to lead the league in votes for this year's All-Star game. Hakeem Olajuwon led the Western Conference voting. Karl Malone and David Robinson were both questionable for the game due to injuries but they ended up playing limited minutes. Dominique Wilkins and Clyde Drexler were not selected.

Larry Johnson came back to the All-Star lineup after missing last year's game due to a serious back injury. It meant a lot for him to come back from the injury and make the All-Star fame the next season. He came back as a reserve this year. Penny Hardaway played his first game as a starter for the Eastern conference team this year. Cedric Ceballos was selected as a reserve, but did not play due to being injured beforehand by Dikembe Mutombo in a regular season game. Mutombo replaced Ceballos.

Michael Jordan missed the game as he was still in the midst of his first retirement from basketball.

Roster

 Cedric Ceballos did not participate due to injury.

 Dikembe Mutombo replaced Cedric Ceballos.

Box score

Eastern Conference

Western Conference

Match data

References

External links
1995 NBA All-Star Game
http://articles.baltimoresun.com/1995-02-10/sports/1995041184_1_nba-all-star-game-all-star-ballot-all-star-starters
http://aroyalpain.com/2015/02/15/sacramento-kings-flashback-mitch-richmond-winning-1995-nba-star-game-mvp-award/
http://sneakerhistory.com/2015/02/mitch-richmond-1995-nba-star-game-mvp/
https://www.si.com/extra-mustard/2015/02/11/nba-all-star-game-1995-five-facts
http://basketball.realgm.com/player/Penny-Hardaway/Summary/980

National Basketball Association All-Star Game
All-Star
Basketball competitions in Phoenix, Arizona
NBA All-Star
GMA Network television specials